The 185th Pennsylvania House of Representatives District is located in Southeast Pennsylvania and has been represented since 2020 by Regina Young.

District profile
The 185th Pennsylvania House of Representatives District is located in Delaware County and Philadelphia County and encompasses the Philadelphia International Airport and the Simeone Foundation Automotive Museum. It also includes the following areas:

 Delaware County
 Colwyn
 Darby Township (PART, Wards 01 and 02)
 Sharon Hill
 Philadelphia
 Ward 26
 Ward 36 [PART, Divisions 10, 11, 12, 13 and 15]
 Ward 40 [PART, Divisions 01, 15, 16, 17, 18, 22, 27, 28, 29, 30, 31, 32, 35, 36, 37, 38, 39, 40, 41, 42, 43, 44, 45, 46, 48, 49, 50 and 51]
 Ward 48 [PART, Divisions 01, 02, 03 and 13]

Representatives

Recent election results

References

Sources

External links
District map from the United States Census Bureau
Pennsylvania House Legislative District Maps from the Pennsylvania Redistricting Commission.  
Population Data for District 185 from the Pennsylvania Redistricting Commission.

Government of Delaware County, Pennsylvania
Government of Philadelphia
185